The 2015 Swiss Open Grand Prix Gold was the Fourth grand prix gold and grand prix tournament of the 2015 BWF Grand Prix and Grand Prix Gold. The tournament was held in St. Jakobshalle, Basel, Switzerland from March 10–15, 2015 and had a total purse of $120,000.

Men's singles

Seeds

  Srikanth Kidambi (champion)
  Viktor Axelsen (final)
  Tommy Sugiarto (withdrew)
  Tian Houwei (second round)
  Hu Yun (first round)
  Rajiv Ouseph (withdrew)
  Hsu Jen-hao (quarter-final)
  Takuma Ueda (quarter-final)
  Chong Wei Feng (withdrew)
  Ng Ka Long (third round)
  Riichi Takeshita (second round)
  Sai Praneeth (third round)
  Wang Tzu-wei (third round)
  Andre Kurniawan Tedjono (third round)
  Henri Hurskainen (withdrew)
  Anand Pawar (third round)

Finals

Top half

Section 1

Section 2

Section 3

Section 4

Bottom half

Section 5

Section 6

Section 7

Section 8

Women's singles

Seeds

  Wang Yihan (quarter-final)
  Pusarla Venkata Sindhu (withdrew)
  Sayaka Takahashi (semi-final)
  Michelle Li (quarter-final)
  Akane Yamaguchi (semi-final)
  Sun Yu (champion)
  Nichaon Jindapon (quarter-final)
  Busanan Ongbumrungpan (final)

Finals

Top half

Section 1

Section 2

Bottom half

Section 3

Section 4

Men's doubles

Seeds

  Mads Conrad-Petersen / Mads Pieler Kolding (withdrew)
  Michael Fuchs / Johannes Schöttler (withdrew)
  Cai Yun / Lu Kai (champion)
  Anders Skårup Rasmussen / Kim Astrup Sorensen (quarter-final)
  Adam Cwalina / Przemysław Wacha (second round)
  Goh V Shem / Tan Wee Kiong (final)
  Gideon Markus Fernaldi / Kevin Sanjaya Sukamuljo (semi-final)
  Max Schwenger / Josche Zurwonne (semi-final)

Finals

Top half

Section 1

Section 2

Bottom half

Section 3

Section 4

Women's doubles

Seeds

  Reika Kakiiwa / Miyuki Maeda (semi-final)
  Eefje Muskens / Selena Piek (semi-final)
  Shizuka Matsuo / Mami Naito (withdrew)
  Pia Zebadiah Bernadeth  / Rizki Amelia Pradipta (first round)
  Bao Yixin / Tang Yuanting (champion)
  Gabriela Stoeva / Stefani Stoeva (quarter-final)
  Jwala Gutta / Ashwini Ponnappa (withdrew)
  Puttita Supajirakul / Sapsiree Taerattanachai (second round)

Finals

Top half

Section 1

Section 2

Bottom half

Section 3

Section 4

Mixed doubles

Seeds

  Tantowi Ahmad / Lilyana Natsir (semi-final)
  Chris Adcock / Gabrielle Adcock (quarter-final)
  Liu Cheng / Bao Yixin (final)
  Riky Widianto / Richi Puspita Dili (semi-final)
  Lu Kai / Huang Yaqiong (champion)
  Praveen Jordan / Debby Susanto (quarter-final)
  Maneepong Jongjit / Sapsiree Taerattanachai (withdrew)
  Max Schwenger / Carla Nelte (first round)

Finals

Top half

Section 1

Section 2

Bottom half

Section 3

Section 4

References

Swiss Open (badminton)
BWF Grand Prix Gold and Grand Prix
Swiss Open Grand Prix Gold
Swiss Open Grand Prix Gold
Sports competitions in Basel